Henrik Stamer Hedin (born 10 July 1946) is a Danish communist and translator, chairman of Communist Party of Denmark since 2003, and editor of CPD's (Danish DKP) party newspaper Skub. He was first time chosen as CPD's (Danish DKP) executive committee in 1993. At CPD's (Danish DKP) 33rd congress, held in 2012, he was reelected to the executive committee and subsequently reelected as chairman of the party and the new executive committee.

Henrik Stamer Hedin is a vocal critic of imperialism. While raised as a political conservative, Hedin became a Marxist and joined the Communist Party of Denmark.

References

External links 
 Henrik Stamer Hedin talking during congress
 Depicting Henrik Stalmer Hedin's ties to DKP 
 Hedin's early life and political views 

1946 births
Living people
Communist Party of Denmark politicians
Leaders of political parties in Denmark